George Dunlop (born 16 January 1956) is a former Northern Ireland international footballer.

Career 
During his club career he played as a goalkeeper for Manchester City, Glentoran, Ballymena United, Linfield, Larne, and RUC. He was named Ulster Footballer of the Year for the 1980/81 season, while at Linfield.

International 
He earned 4 caps for the Northern Ireland national football team, and was part of the team at the 1982 FIFA World Cup when Northern Ireland reached the second round.

Dunlop won scores of medals as a part of Roy Coyle's massively successful Linfield team that dominated irish league football in the 1980s. He was a natural shot stopper with fast reactions and known for pulling off often miraculous saves

Personal life 
His nephew is the former Rangers and Northern Ireland national under-21 football team player Josh Robinson.

References

External links
Northern Ireland's Footballing Greats: George Dunlop

1956 births
Living people
Association footballers from Belfast
Association footballers from Northern Ireland
Ulster Footballers of the Year
Northern Ireland Football Writers' Association Players of the Year
Northern Ireland international footballers
1982 FIFA World Cup players
Manchester City F.C. players
Glentoran F.C. players
Ballymena United F.C. players
Linfield F.C. players
Larne F.C. players
PSNI F.C. players
NIFL Premiership players
Association football goalkeepers